Tearin' Into Trouble is a 1927 American silent Western film directed by Richard Thorpe and starring Hal Taliaferro, Olive Hasbrouck and Walter Brennan.

Cast
 Hal Taliaferro as Wally Tilland 
 Olive Hasbrouck as Ruth Martin 
 Walter Brennan as Billy Martin 
 Tom Bay as Johnnie 
 Nita Cavalier as Maisie

References

Bibliography
 Langman, Larry. A Guide to Silent Westerns. Greenwood Publishing Group, 1992.

External links
 

1927 films
1927 Western (genre) films
1920s English-language films
American black-and-white films
Pathé Exchange films
Films directed by Richard Thorpe
Silent American Western (genre) films
1920s American films